Diane Marie Evers (born 2 July 1963) is an Australian politician. She was elected to the Western Australian Legislative Council at the 2017 state election, as a Greens member in South West Region. Her term began on 22 May 2017, and ended on 21 May 2021 following her defeat at the 2021 state election.

Evers was born in Chicago, and worked in the United States as an accountant before emigrating to Australia in 1984. She served on the Albany City Council Council from 1999 to 2003.  In 2001, Evers was a candidate for the now-defunct Liberals for Forests, a centre-right party led by Janet Woollard which had a focus on environmentalism and ending the logging of the State's forests. Evers ran as a Greens candidate in Stirling in 2005 and Albany in 2008 and 2013. Before being elected in 2017, Evers was the state manager of Green Skills.

References

1963 births
Living people
Australian Greens members of the Parliament of Western Australia
Members of the Western Australian Legislative Council
American emigrants to Australia
People from Chicago
21st-century Australian politicians
21st-century Australian women politicians
Women members of the Western Australian Legislative Council